Clemente Bocciardo (1620–1658) was an Italian painter of the Baroque. He was born in Genoa. He was also called Clementone because of his large size. He was a pupil of Bernardo Strozzi and accompanied Giovanni Benedetto Castiglione to Rome.  He painted a Martyrdom of St. Sebastian for the church of the Carthusians in Pisa. Also painted in Florence.

Life and Work
He was born in Genoa in 1620, he was a pupil of Bernardo Strozzi, but he left his city very young to complete his education, together with Castiglione, first in Rome then in Florence. In Genoa, where he painted, according to Ratti, a Last Supper for the oratory of St. Germano (later in Santa Maria della Pietà) and a Corpus Domini for the church of St. Andrea, nothing remained of him. Leaving Florence, at least from 1639 he stayed in Pisa, where he died in 1658.

He executed  Baptist (signed and dated 1639) in the Del Pozzo chapel in Camposanto. One of the first works painted in Pisa was St. Carlo Borromeo in St. Frediano, and Madonna and Saints in the church of St. Matteo. Dispersed are two paintings with the Saints Peter and Paul, who were still in the cathedral in 1912 over the little porticoes leading to the terrace of the relics, a canvas with St. Benedetto on the high altar of the church of the same name (now deconsecrated),  St. Sebastiano in Charterhouse, an Immaculate Conception in Santa Croce in Fossabanda.

Some works, now dispersed, were in churches of Brescia. In Santa Maria delle Grazie, an altarpiece with St. Ignatius. Averoldi cited a shovel with Madonna with the Saints Michele and Antonio, in Saints Faustino and Giovita.

The Strozzi school had an impact that was anything but decisive in the pictorial formation of Bocciardo, and perhaps just indicative. Having chosen, on his pilgrimage to Rome and Florence, an itinerary so divergent from the master, he rather developed his interest in the novelties brought from Rome, where he had been among the admirers of Caravaggio. In fact, he spent a short time in Florence, where the competition was still strong, while he ended up settling permanently in Pisa, where he acquired fame and important commissions.

References

Specific

1620 births
1658 deaths
17th-century Genoese people
17th-century Italian painters
Italian male painters
Painters from Genoa
Italian Baroque painters